Alberto Dossena (born 13 October 1998) is an Italian football player who plays as a defender for  club Cagliari.

Club career
He made his professional debut in the Serie B for Perugia on 4 March 2017 in a game against Avellino.

On 2 August 2019, he joined Alessandria on loan.

On 15 September 2020 he joined Avellino, with Atalanta retaining a buy-back option.

On 12 August 2022, Dossena signed a four-year contract with Cagliari.

References

External links
 

1998 births
Living people
Footballers from Brescia
Italian footballers
Association football defenders
Serie B players
Serie C players
Atalanta B.C. players
A.C. Perugia Calcio players
A.C.N. Siena 1904 players
U.S. Pistoiese 1921 players
U.S. Alessandria Calcio 1912 players
U.S. Avellino 1912 players
Cagliari Calcio players